Canada's Worst Driver was a Canadian television series that aired on Discovery Channel from 2005-2018, based on Britain's Worst Driver. It and sister series Canada's Worst Handyman (2006-2011) are the two highest-rated programs on Discovery Channel. The series is produced by Proper Television whose president, Guy O'Sullivan, was the director for the original Britain's Worst Driver series; as such, Canada's Worst Driver is considered to be the production company's flagship show. Unlike other Worst series around the world, the Canadian version emphasizes on the learning process of the contestants and the science of driving and, as such, is often more serious than the other Worst shows around the world, which are mainly played for laughs. It is the longest running of any Worst series to date with 14 seasons and 115 episodes (assuming specials are included).

Format
In each season, eight drivers and their nominators are taken to the Driver Rehabilitation Centre, where they compete in challenges designed to improve their driving skills in an effort to not be named Canada's Worst Driver. In the first challenge, the contestants begin at a location about an hour's drive from the Driver Rehabilitation Centre; for the contestants' first challenge, they must head to the Driver Rehabilitation Centre, following the directions that are given to each contestant. After arriving at the Driver Rehabilitation Centre, the driver's licenses of each contestant is confiscated (for the first two seasons, their car keys were confiscated instead). 
The first episode concludes with an obstacle course challenge, meant to evaluate the skills of the individual drivers. The series is well-known for their obstacle course challenges; contestants must routinely maneuver their cars through tight spaces with less than an inch of clearance on either side. To show that the challenge can be done without hitting obstacles by an average driver, host Andrew Younghusband performs each challenge before any contestant attempts the challenge. Beginning with the second episode, each contestant meets with a panel of four experts and Andrew for an evaluation of their performance and after all remaining contestants are interviewed, the judges and Andrew deliberate on which contestant and nominator pair have improved enough to graduate from the Driver Rehabilitation Centre. The driver who has graduated is eliminated from the competition and is sent home with their licenses returned to them; the contestants typically drive off with their nominators in the car that they used to arrive at the Driver Rehabilitation Centre. The experts also reserve the right to not graduate anyone for any episode or to graduate multiple contestants at the same time. The experts may also choose to expel any contestant who does not show any incentive to learn or who the experts believe should not continue driving; the licenses are returned. In this case, the contestant is eliminated from the competition and their licenses are returned and they are given a ride home. The elimination process continues until only three contestants remain (the original intent was for only two drivers remain in the first season, but due to an episode where no one graduated due to an overall horrific performance in the Icy Corner Challenge, three remained for the final episode; every season since has had three finalists, although Andrew twice suggested a four-person finale-- the seventh season and the tenth season). The three remaining contestants are then given the Mega-Challenge, an obstacle course challenge with elements of every previous challenge, as well as a standard driver's examination through the busy streets of a major urban city near the Driver Rehabilitation Centre. 
Based on these final challenges, the experts determine which among the three is named Canada's Worst Driver. With the exception of the eleventh season, the contestant who fared the second-worst is deemed to not be a graduate, while the contestant who fared the third-worst is considered a graduate. 
Unlike other versions of the Worst Driver series around the world, where being eliminated early or being the Worst Driver is either rewarded with a new car or had their car destroyed, no prizes are given for being eliminated early or for being named Canada's Worst Driver, aside from a commemorative trophy.

Experts

Challenges
With the exception of the first and last episodes, challenges are specifically tailored to each contestant and designed by Andrew and the driving school sponsoring the series (whose head instructor is one of the experts; for the first three seasons, it was Young Drivers of Canada Director of Training Scott Marshall; in season four, it was Dan Bagyan of the Signature Driving School; in seasons five-seven, it was Peter Mellor of the Advanced Motoring Bureau and from the eighth season onward, it was Tim Danter of DriveWise). Challenges typically range from traditional driving school lessons such as parallel parking, reversing and driving with a trailer to those not normally found in a beginner's driving course, such as driving a standard transmission vehicle and extreme driving manoeuvres (such as the Scandinavian flick). However, there are some challenges that are reused from year-to-year, like The Eye of the Needle and The Water Tank Challenge, which were both first introduced in the first season and are the only challenges to be featured in every season.
The Shoulder Check Challenge is a challenge where contestants must drive in a straight line until they pass a sign on each side. The signs determine which of the two exits the contestants must take when the road forks ahead; however, the signs are posted in the reverse direction, so the contestants must briefly look behind them to read the signs. If neither exit is permitted (both signs are red), they are simply instructed to stop in front of the fork in the road. The lesson of this challenge is to only turn the head when performing a shoulder check, not the entire human body, as that will turn the car's wheels.
Distracted Driving is a challenge introduced in the second season that was so unusually effective on one contestant (Matt Elkind) that it has been used in every subsequent season. In this challenge, drivers must drive around in a circle while having to do a series of tasks such as eating a sandwich, inserting a CD, texting and so on. Often, these tasks are tailored to each contestant's vices. The lesson is meant to teach individuals to not do these things while at the wheel, as it can cause potential accidents.
Swerve and Avoid is a challenge where contestants must drive towards a wall at high speeds, only to turn away – that is, swerve – at the last moment to avoid hitting the wall. Typically, there are two exits to each side of the wall, which will either initially be blocked before one or both open at the last moment or initially be open before one or neither are blocked in the last moment. The lesson is to avoid touching the brake pedal, as putting the foot down on the brake will severely limit the car's steering ability and lead to crashing.
The Cornering Challenge (called Driving into a Wall in the first two seasons) is a challenge where contestants must drive towards a wall of foam blocks at high speed before braking hard, releasing the brake and then turning away from the wall. The lesson in this challenge is to release the brake so as to not lose steering input to the car when it is needed. In some seasons, a large wet tarp may also be laid out on the ground in front of the wall, to simulate icy or slippery conditions.
The Three-Point Turn Challenge (called The Dirty Circle in the second season) is a challenge where contestants must enter a small space and make a three-point turn, returning in the direction that they entered. The entrance may either be off to one side of the area (earlier seasons) or to the centre of the area (later seasons). A key lesson in this challenge is to make use of the space available to the car in order to do the turn efficiently; in some seasons, obstacles may ring the outer perimeter of the area to give the contestants a better visual cue.
The Eye of the Needle is a perennial challenge where contestants must navigate through a series of archways at a minimum speed. The intended lesson is to have the driver look where they want to go, in the middle of the archways rather than at the feet on one side of the archway.
The Figure-Eight Challenge (called Broken Hearts in the third season) is a perennial challenge introduced where drivers must reverse their car around a course in the shape of an 8. There are two versions of this challenge, the first of which originally featured in the second season, with a pair of contestants performing the challenge simultaneously: both cars begin in one end of the course and contestants must reverse their cars to where the other contestant began, with the only passing spaces available at the centre and opposite end of the course, while the second version, introduced in the fourth season, had each contestant do one lap in reverse with the remaining contestants as passengers.
Canada's Worst Parking Lot is a version of musical chairs where drivers must find spaces to park. The parking lot is filled with cars and may have blocker cars that attempt to frustrate the contestants and cars that may open up new parking spaces. Any driving violation—such as parking in a no parking zone or hitting a stationary object—will typically send the contestant out of the parking lot in a lap penalty. The challenge ends when one contestant fails to park.
Canada's Worst Gas Station is a variation on the Canada's Worst Parking Lot Challenge featured in the second season and the eighth season with many of the same rules, but instead of just trying to find spaces to park, contestants also try to get fuel at a simulated self-service gasoline station, avoiding the diesel pump, which their car can't use. Hitting anything or performing a moving violation requires the contestant to leave the station and come back to try again. Most of the pumps start with blocker cars in front of them, which will leave as the challenge goes on. The challenge ends when one contestant fails to get fuel.
The Water Tank Challenge is a perennial favorite in which the contestants must navigate around a tight obstacle course in a car with a roof-mounted water tank; should the contestants stop too abruptly, the contents of the tank will spill over into the cab of the vehicle, soaking its occupants. In earlier seasons, this was done with a pipe system, though in later seasons, open-top cars or cars with a sunroof are used. Portions of the obstacle course include a slow forward section, sudden stops due to last-minute reactions, such as a hidden stop sign or a pop-out car, a humpinfamous for repeatedly soaking Andrew in his demonstration runsand optionally an acceleration portion. The intended lesson is on smooth threshold braking: should the contestants brake poorly or navigate too quickly, the water in the tank will spill, soaking both the contestant and nominator inside.
The Handbrake Turn Challenge is a challenge introduced in the third season that has contestants perform a handbrake turn around a foam figure while in a confined space. The intent of this challenge is for contestants to learn the distribution of weight in a car, as well as a lesson on how to properly control a car in a skid.
The Reverse Flick is a challenge that has contestants perform the namesake technique in a confined space; it is in essence the handbrake turn in reverse, and without the use of the handbrake. The intent of this challenge is similar to the handbrake turn challenge, but also introduces elements of driving in reverse at speed.
Drifting Doughnuts (called Burning Out in the third season) is a challenge where contestants must drive in a wide doughnut around a figure; the key to this challenge is counter-steering partway through in order to allow the car to continue drifting, eventually towards a designated exit point. The lesson behind this challenge is on extreme manoeuvres as well as avoiding target fixation.
The Trough is a challenge introduced in the fifth season where contestants must get their car to move across the namesake trough, a series of concrete Jersey barriers placed on their side, without the car leaving the rails and hitting the ground. The lesson behind this challenge is that the rear wheels will turn more sharply than the front wheels; the key to this challenge is to take wide turns and allow the car to hug the edges of the concrete rails.
The Parallel Parking Challenge is a perennial challenge that requires drivers to parallel park. Often, there is a moving obstacle, such as an emergency vehicle in the third season, that the contestant must give way to.
The Teeter-Totter (called The Balance-Beam for Unbalanced Drivers in the third season) is a challenge that has contestants balance a car atop a teeter-totter, such that both ends for the apparatus are off of the ground. The lesson of this challenge is on managing cars on slopes. The Gimbal is a variation of the teeter-totter challenge, where lateral motion is also introduced.
The Slalom Challenge is a challenge where drivers "swerve" around blue and pink foam mannequins. In the seventh season, they were changed into red and blue hockey players, in keeping with that season's "Driving in Canada" theme. In the eighth season, they were changed into blue and pink shopping people, in keeping with that season's "Big city driving" theme.
The Lane Change Challenge is a challenge where the drivers are on a two-lane course. The goal is to pass Andrew twice as he drives around. Key to this challenge is learning the proper technique for lane changes (check mirrors, signal, shoulder check, change lanes). Each infraction committed or improperly-executed lane change requires the guilty driver to pass Andrew one extra time. The challenge concludes when only one contestant is left on the course.

Nomination
Like its sister series, the contestants are chosen by nominations submitted to Proper Television. Until June 2011, when Canada's Worst Handyman was cancelled and later replaced in April 2015 with Blood, Sweat & Tools (which was itself cancelled after nine episodes), Canada's Worst Driver and Canada's Worst Handyman were filmed alternately, with each season of Driver followed by a season of Handyman (except for the first season, in which Handyman was filmed during the summer and Driver was filmed during the winter, Driver has been filmed during the summer and Handyman was filmed during the winter). Nominations for the next season of one are accepted shortly after the airing of another on Discovery Channel. Also, like its sister series, candidates may be nominated by multiple nominators, though only one nominator accompanies the contestant to the Driver Rehabilitation Centre.

Home Video/Internet Availability
Seasons 1-7 are currently available for download in Canada from the iTunes Store in widescreen standard definition (480p). Seasons 8-14 are available from iTunes in both standard and high definition (720p/1080p). Seasons 13 and 14 are available for streaming on CraveTV. Each season has also been posted on DiscoveryChannel.ca and YouTube for streaming. There has been no news on whether the series will be released on DVD/Blu-ray.

Seasons

See also
World's Worst Driver
Don't Drive Here

References

External links
 Canada's Worst Driver on discovery.ca
 

 
2000s Canadian reality television series
2010s Canadian reality television series
2005 Canadian television series debuts
2018 Canadian television series endings
Television series by Bell Media
Television series by Proper Television
Worst Driver (franchise)
Canadian television series based on British television series